Laure Marsac (born 18 February 1970) is a French actress. She has appeared in more than fifty films since 1984.

Filmography

References

External links 

Actresses from Paris
1970 births
Living people
French film actresses
Most Promising Actress César Award winners